Keyna Wilkins is an Australian/British composer-musician. Her compositions are published and distributed by Wirripang Music.

Wilkins was a finalist in the Australian Music Centre and APRA AMCOS 2021 Art Music Awards in the category Award for Excellence in Experimental Music, for "recording and developing new projects in 2020". She was also a finalist in the 2018 Art Music Awards, in the category Award for Excellence by an Individual, for her "activities in original art music throughout 2017 as a composer-musician including releasing three original albums".

Wilkins is passionate about supporting refugees being detained in Immigration Detention. In 2021 she collaborated with visual artist and poet Jalal Mahamede, who is currently being held in Brisbane's immigration detention centre. They have released an album, featuring original music by Wilkins and poetry by Mahamede.

Education 
Wilkins holds a Master of Music Composition from the Sydney Conservatorium of Music. Her thesis is titled Astronomical Phenomena in Music Composition and explores "the astronomical phenomena in music composition".

Prior to moving to Australia, Wilkins studied at Bristol University (UK) where is obtained a MA Flute Performance (2008) and BA Mus (2003).

Composer 
Wilkins has written over 60 art music compositions are published/distributed by Wirripang Music and five tunes in the Australian Jazz Real Book.

Her music has been featured as part of the ABC Ausmusic month. She has also been included on Making Waves.

Wilkins is an Associate Artist represented by the Australian Music Centre.

Wilkins' compositions have been commissioned and/or performed by artists and ensembles including The Metropolitan Orchestra, Syzygy Ensemble, Kammerklang, and Elysian Fields.

Performer 
Wilkins is an active performer, who has been described as "unconstrained by labels and is constantly exploring new ways to express herself musically" and as "a powerhouse player – with taste". In her performances, she explores stream-of-consciousness improvisations alongside her composed pieces and re-interpretations, often using loop pedal and visual projections. She has a range of musical themes in her shows from human rights to astronomy to nature, and she tailors her shows to the venue and audience.

Outer space is a major inspiration for her music and she often uses open source NASA footage to accompany the performance. Her improvisations are spontaneous musical ideas inspired by her myriad of music experiences with the aim of synthesizing into one voice, creating emotional connection and attaining a meditative state.

She performs her own notated music, as well as being an improviser. Wilkins often improvises with First Nations didgeridoo player Gumaroy Newman as an indigenous-jazz fusion duo, Yulugi. In 2019 they were interviewed by Andrew Ford, on the ABC Radio National program The Music Show.

Wilkin's is also a founding member of the Ephemera Quartet. Their 2021 album Blackholes and Modulations was reviewed by the Sydney Morning Herald as "the end result is music of peculiar depth and mystery that somehow evades the laws of gravity".

There have been other collaborations with other high profile Sydney musicians, including Emily Granger  and Jeremy Rose.

Her debut album is titled Air in motion was launched at the Flute Tree in Sydney, Australia.

Discography

References 

Australian women composers
Living people
Year of birth missing (living people)
Australian flautists
APRA Award winners
Sydney Conservatorium of Music alumni